Mineral Springs is the name of several locations in the United States:

 Mineral Springs, Arkansas
 Mineral Springs, Indiana
 Mineral Spring, Missouri
 Mineral Springs, North Carolina
 Mineral Springs Township, North Dakota
 Mineral Springs, Ohio
 Mineral Springs at Green Springs, Ohio
 Mineral Springs, Marion County, Tennessee
 Mineral Springs, Overton County, Tennessee
 Mineral Springs, Texas
 Mineral Springs, West Virginia
 Mineral Spring Turnpike
 Sycamore Mineral Springs Resort in California
 Mineral Springs Falls, in Hamilton, Ontario, Canada
 Mineral Springs Resort in Washington

See also
Mineral spring
Mineral spa
Mineral water